Taherlu (also Romanized as Ţāherlū and Taher loo; also known as Tehārlū) is a village in Kuhin Rural District, in the Central District of Kabudarahang County, Hamadan Province, Iran. At the 2006 census, its population was 1,017, in 216 families.

References 

Populated places in Kabudarahang County